Leuben is a quarter and a borough (Stadtbezirk) of the German city of Dresden. The borough Leuben consists of the quarters Leuben, Laubegast, Kleinzschachwitz and Großzschachwitz. Its population is 38,353 (2020).

References

Boroughs and quarters of Dresden